Heliodiaptomus kolleruensis is a species of copepod in the family Diaptomidae. It was described in 1981 from specimens collected in the Krishna River, Lake Kolleru and bodies of water in Guntur district, Andhra Pradesh, India. It is listed as a vulnerable species on the IUCN Red List.

References

Diaptomidae
Arthropods of India
Freshwater crustaceans of Asia
Taxonomy articles created by Polbot
Crustaceans described in 1981